Sir Alexander Fleming (1881–1955) was a Scottish physician and microbiologist.

Alexander Fleming may also refer to:

Alexander Fleming (doctor) (1824–1875), Scottish doctor
Al Fleming (basketball) (1954–2003), American basketball player
Black Atlass (born Alex Fleming in 1994), Canadian singer-songwriter

See also

 Fleming (disambiguation)